241 Pizza is a Canadian franchise chain of quick-serve pizza restaurants headquartered in the Toronto district of Scarborough, Ontario.

241 Pizza has 62 locations across Ontario, predominantly in Southern Ontario, and has expanded throughout Canada with stores in other provinces across the country in Newfoundland, Manitoba, and Saskatchewan.

History
241 Pizza was founded in Toronto in 1986. Since then 241 Pizza has expanded across Ontario, and has locations in four provinces.

Coffee Time's parent company Chairman's Brand Corp. acquired 241 Pizza in October 2006.

See also
 List of Canadian pizza chains

References

External links
 

Pizza chains of Canada
Regional restaurant chains in Canada
Companies based in Scarborough, Toronto
Restaurants established in 1986
Canadian companies established in 1986
1986 establishments in Ontario